Takahiro Arai (Japanese: 新井 貴浩, born January 30, 1977, in Naka-ku, Hiroshima) is a Japanese professional baseball player for the Hiroshima Toyo Carp in Japan's Nippon Professional Baseball.

His younger brother Ryota is also a professional baseball player currently playing for Hanshin Tigers.

College baseball career 
In 1998, he participated in the Tohto University Baseball League and went 6 for 12 against an American collegiate All-Star team, winning him the league's RBI title. He only homered twice in college. He was drafted in the sixth round of the '98 NPB draft by the Hiroshima Carp, the team he had followed as a kid.

Hiroshima Toyo Carp 

In 1999, Arai hit .221/.288/.484 for Hiroshima, but homered 7 times in 95 AB. He was involved in two bone-head plays in the course of a week. On September 14, he did not try to advance on a home run by Eddy Diaz because he thought it would be caught; Diaz passed him on the bases, resulting in an out. A week later, he lost count of the number of outs and threw away the ball after a double play, allowing a run to score.

Seeing an increase in playing time in 2000, he batted .245/.318/.505 with 16 HR in 208 AB. In '01, he was up to .284/.363/.495 with 18 homers in 313 AB. Finally entering the regular lineup at age 25, he split his time between first base and third in 2002 and batted .287/.342/.514 with 28 homers. He was one homer behind Tomoaki Kanemoto for the team lead and made his first All-Star team. He also led the league with 17 errors.

In 2003, Takahiro slipped to .236/.299/402 with 19 HR and a league-high 16 times grounding into double plays, while striking out 120 times as the primary 1B. His playing time was cut back in '04 but he bounced back to .263/.340/.424. Before the 2005 season, he spent four days and three nights at a Buddhist temple to help his focus, adjusting his swing and improved drastically, putting up a .305/.353/.603 line with 91 runs, 43 homers, 94 RBI and 326 total bases. He moved to third primarily, switching spots with Kenjiro Nomura. He was second in the Central League in slugging (behind Kanemoto) and led the loop in home runs and errors (23). He homered in six straight games, tying Rick Lancellotti's club record. He made his second All-Star team and his first Best Nine (at first instead of third, as Makoto Imaoka was picked there). His brother Ryota was drafted that off-season.

In 2006, Arai hit .299/.336/.479 with 25 home runs and 100 RBI. He was 6th in the Central League in RBI, was third in sacrifice flies (9, one behind co-leaders Alex Ramirez and Shuichi Murata) and 10th in slugging. The next year, he batted .290/.351/.480 with 28 HR and 102 RBI. He tied Seung-yeop Lee for 6th in runs (84), tied Tyrone Woods for second in RBI (behind Ramirez), was 10th in home runs, third in strikeouts (136) and tied for second in double plays ground into (17), one behind Norihiro Nakamura.

2006 World Baseball Classic/2007 Asian Championship 

He played on Japan's team in the 2006 World Baseball Classic and went 1 for 3 with two strikeouts for the champion team. In the 2007 Asian Championship, Arai hit .500/.571/1.000 with 5 RBI in three games; he trailed tourney leader Chin-Feng Chen by one in RBI. Arai helped Japan win the title and clinch a spot in the 2008 Olympics with his performance.

2008 Beijing Olympics 

In the 2008 Olympics, he batted .257/.289/.486 with 2 triples and 7 RBI in 9 games as Japan's starting first baseman despite battling injury. His 2-run homer off of Suk-min Yoon broke a scoreless duel against South Korea in the 6th inning but the Japanese staff blew the lead. With Japan down 5-2 in the 9th, Arai tripled against closer Hitoki Iwase and Shuichi Murata doubled Arai home. Japan got no further in the loss. South Korea would go on to an unbeaten record in Beijing. Arai was 10th in the preliminary round in slugging (.563)

In the opening round, Arai's 6 RBI tied Nate Schierholtz, Atsunori Inaba, Matthew Brown, Alexei Bell and Giorvis Duvergel for 4th, trailing Alfredo Despaigne, Dae-ho Lee and Michel Enríquez.

Arai became head of the Japan Professional Baseball Players Association in 2008, replacing Shinya Miyamoto.

Hanshin Tigers 

Arai moved to the Hanshin Tigers as a free agent for the 2008 season and spent 7 years with club. At the end of the 2014 season, following a lackluster year that would see a decrease in his 2015 salary, Arai informed the Hanshin management of his intention to exercise his free agent rights, signaling the end of his time with the club.

See also

 Tomoaki Kanemoto

External links

 Career statistics - NPB.jp 

1977 births
Living people
Baseball players at the 2008 Summer Olympics
Baseball people from Hiroshima
Hanshin Tigers players
Hiroshima Toyo Carp players
Hiroshima Toyo Carp managers
Japanese people of Korean descent
Komazawa University alumni
Managers of baseball teams in Japan
Naturalized citizens of Japan
Nippon Professional Baseball first basemen
Nippon Professional Baseball MVP Award winners
Nippon Professional Baseball third basemen
Olympic baseball players of Japan
2006 World Baseball Classic players